This is a list of science and science-related occupations, which include various scientific occupations and careers based upon scientific research disciplines and explorers.

Life science
 Biologist
 Biomedical scientist
 Botanist
 Clinical pharmaceutical scientist
 Herpetologist
 Medical laboratory scientist
 Microbiologist
 Neuroscientist
 Physician
 Veterinarian
 Zoologist

Applied science
 Aeronautical engineer
 Biomedical 
 engineer 
 Chemical engineer
 Civil engineer
 Computer engineer
 Educational technologist
 Electrical engineer
 Engineering technician
 Engineering technologist
 Mechanical engineer
 Petrochemical engineer

Formal science
 Computational scientist
 Mathematician A person with an extensive knowledge of mathematics, a field informally defined as being concerned with numbers, data, collection, quantity, structure, space and calculus.

Statistics
 Actuary
 Demographic marketer
 Statistician

General scientific occupations

 Forensic scientist
 Gentleman scientist A financially independent scientist who pursues scientific study as a hobby
 Government scientist
 Healthcare science
 Hiwi A German abbreviation for "assistant scientist"
 Inventor
 Psychologist
 Research fellow
 School science technician
 Science attaché A member of a diplomatic mission (usually an embassy) that focuses on scientific and technical matters
 Scientist

Natural science

 Archaeologist
 Astronaut
 Astronomer
 Biochemist
 Biologist
 Chemist
 Ecologist
 Forester
 Geographer
 Naturalist
 Oceanographer
 Paleontologist
 Pathologist

Physical science
 Chemist
 Physicist

Earth science
 Geographer
 Geologist
 Geoprofessions
 Petroleum geologist

Social science
 Anthropologist
 Economist
 Historian
 Linguist
 Political scientist
 Sociologist
 Urban planner

See also

 Lists of occupations

References

Sci